Ruth Berhe (born July 2, 1995), better known by her stage name Ruth B., is a Canadian singer and songwriter from Edmonton, Alberta. She started by singing songs on Vine in early 2013. In November 2015, she released her debut extended play The Intro. On May 5, 2017, she released her debut album Safe Haven. It has gathered over 1.96 billion overall streams on Spotify as of March 2023. Her single "Lost Boy" has accumulated over 745 million streams on Spotify, and her YouTube channel has received a total of 526 million views .

Her song "Dandelions" from Safe Haven became a sleeper hit in 2022, when it grew in popularity due to TikTok and charted internationally. It has accumulated over 901 million streams on Spotify as of March 2023.

Early life and education 
Berhe was born and raised in Edmonton, Alberta. Her parents emigrated from Ethiopia in the 1980s. Berhe speaks her parents' native language Amharic fluently. She spent some of her teenage years working at a local Reitmans clothing store and described herself in an interview with The Canadian Press as an "introvert". She said she was "never the big party chick." While working part-time she started to dabble in posting videos on Vine. She says she chose the six-second video service because it took less effort to upload short clips, compared to other popular services like YouTube.

Berhe graduated from Ross Sheppard High School in 2013. She attended MacEwan University, but took time off her studies to focus on music.

Career 
Berhe posted her first Vine video in May 2013, and started making singing Vines about a year later. Her singing Vines, typically six second covers of popular songs, helped her grow a following. In November 2014, she posted a Vine of herself singing a line that she had made up, which was inspired by the television series Once Upon a Time. It garnered around 84,000 likes within a week, which was unusual for her at the time. She took note of its popularity, with some of her followers commenting that she should make it into a full song. It became  "Lost Boy", which she shared to YouTube on January 18, 2015. The song and "Superficial Love" was featured on her EP The Intro later that year and on her 2017 debut album Safe Haven, which included the promotional single "Dandelions". 

Berhe was nominated for the Juno Fan Choice Award and Songwriter of the Year, and won Breakthrough Artist of the Year at the 2017 Juno Awards. In June, she honoured National Arts Centre Award winner Michael Bublé at the Governor General's Performing Arts Awards gala by performing his song "Home" as well as Bryan Adams' "Heaven" during Adams' induction for the Lifetime Achievement Award at the SOCAN Awards. In September, she performed Neil Young's "Heart of Gold" for his induction into the Canadian Songwriters Hall Of Fame. 

At the 2018 Juno Awards, she was nominated for three awards including Artist of the Year, Album of the Year, and Pop Album of the Year. The CBC Kids television series Addison also debuted that year, with a theme song performed by Berhe. In May, her song "Shadows" appeared in the second season of the Netflix series Dear White People.

In 2019, she released an EP called Maybe I'll Find You Again.

In the summer of 2020, she released the song "If I Have a Son" and "Dirty Nikes". On December 3, she performed a virtual concert to raise money for people working in the music industry during the COVID-19 pandemic. 

In 2021, her second album Moments in Between was released.

In August 2022, her song "Paper Airplanes" was featured as the leading original song for A Jazzman's Blues soundtrack.

Discography

Studio albums

EPs

Singles

As lead artist

Promotional singles

Awards and nominations

Artistry 
Berhe has listed Lauryn Hill, The Beatles, Carole King, Grouplove, Adele, Taylor Swift and Ed Sheeran as some of her musical influences. She said that "the one thing all my favourite artists have in common is they are all storytellers. Something that I try to incorporate in my music", in an interview with Idolator.

Notes

References

External links 
 
 

1995 births
Living people
Canadian women singer-songwriters
Columbia Records artists
MacEwan University alumni
Musicians from Edmonton
Vine (service) celebrities
Canadian people of Ethiopian descent
21st-century Black Canadian women singers
Juno Award for Breakthrough Artist of the Year winners
Canadian women pop singers